The following is a list of characters from the wuxia novel Ode to Gallantry by Jin Yong.

Main character
 Shi Potian is the protagonist of the novel who is often mistaken for Shi Zhongyu due to the similarity in appearance between them. Other names he has used include Gouzazhong (a colloquialism for "bastard"), "Great Dumpling" and "Shi Yidao".

Xuansu Manor
 Shi Zhongyu
 Shi Qing
 Min Rou

Snowy Mountain School

Second generation members
 Bai Zizai is the leader of the Snowy Mountain School. He suffers from depression after his wife left him. He becomes extremely proud and arrogant, and constantly believes that his martial arts are the best until he is defeated by Shi Potian. He attends the Laba Feast on Heroes' Island with the intention of upholding the reputation of his school.
 Cheng Zixue
 Qi Zimian
 Liao Zili
 Liang Zijin

Third generation members
 Feng Wanli is the eldest apprentice of Bai Zizai and the master of Shi Zhongyu.
 Bai Wanjian is Bai Zizai and Shi Xiaocui's son. He is Bai Axiu's father.
 Geng Wanzhong
 Wang Wanren
 Ke Wanjun
 Huyan Wanshan
 Bao Wanye
 Wang Wanyi
 Hua Wanzi is the youngest apprentice of Bai Zizai.

Golden Crow School
 Shi Xiaocui, also called Granny Shi, is Bai Zizai's wife and Bai Wanjian's mother. She becomes Shi Potian's martial arts master. Earlier on, she left the Snowy Mountain School after a disagreement with her husband and founded the Golden Crow School.
 Bai Axiu is Bai Wanjian's daughter. She attempts suicide by jumping down a cliff after being allegedly raped by Shi Zhongyu, but is later saved by Shi Xiaocui. She meets Shi Potian by chance and falls in love with him.

Changle Gang
 Situ Heng is the former leader of the gang and Shi Zhongyu's predecessor. He leaves the gang after refusing to accept the expected invitation from Heroes' Island and engaging in an argument with Shi Zhongyu.
 Bei Haishi is the deputy leader of the gang. He makes Shi Zhongyu join the gang and become its puppet leader. He is the mastermind behind the mix-up between Shi Potian and Shi Zhongyu; he made marks on Shi Potian to make him replace Shi Zhongyu as the leader of the Changle Gang in an attempt to escape from being its leader and receive the invitation from Heroes' Island.
 Chen Chongzhi
 Mi Hengye
 Zhan Fei
 Shijian is Shi Zhongyu's servant.

Ding family and associates
 Ding Dang is Shi Zhongyu's lover.
 Ding Busan is Ding Dang's grandfather.
 Ding Busi is Ding Busan's younger brother.
 Mei Wenxin
 Mei Fanggu is the illegitimate daughter of Ding Busi and Mei Wenxin. She is the stepmother of Shi Potian and treats him badly, but her true identity is not revealed until the end of the novel.

Heroes' Island
 Zhang San and Li Si are the sworn brothers of Shi Potian. They are the apprentices of the lords of Heroes' Island. They are feared for their ruthlessness throughout the jianghu. They meet Shi Potian by chance and forge a friendship with him.
 Island Lord Long and Island Lord Mu are the lords of Heroes' Island and masters of Zhang San and Li Si. They die soon upon finding out the truth behind the carvings on the caves on the island from Shi Potian.

Four major school leaders of Guandong
 Fan Yifei
 Gao Sanniangzi
 Lü Zhengping
 Feng Liang

Shangqing Monastery
 Tianxu
 Chongxu is the ill-tempered junior of Tianxu. He engages Shi Potian in a duel after Shi unintentionally insulted him. 
 Lingxu
 Zhaoxu
 Tongxu

Miscellaneous characters
 Xie Yanke is a martial artist living on Sky-scraping Cliff. He is the owner of the Black Iron Tablets. He holds the young Gouzazhong captive, takes him to the cliff and teaches him qi-cultivation techniques in the wrong order in an attempt to kill him, but fails.
 Wu Daotong
 Elder Dabei is the lord of the White Whale Island. He is killed by members of the Changle Gang, but manages to pass 18 wooden dolls to Shi Potian before his death.
 Cheng Dayang is the leader of the Flying Fish Gang. He is killed by Zhang San and Li Si after refusing to join the Laba Feast on Heroes' Island.
 An Fengtian, Feng Zhenwu and Taoist Yuancheng are the chiefs of the Golden Saber Stronghold.
 Zhou Mu is a subordinate of An Fengtian who is responsible for the murder of Wu Daotong.

References

Lists of Jin Yong characters
Ode to Gallantry